Mackie is brand of professional audio equipment.

Mackie may also refer to:

In geography
Mackie River, Western Australia
Mackie Lake (Manitoba), Canada
Mackie Lake (Ontario), Canada, north of Plevna, Ontario
Mackie Lake, (Wisconsin), United States - see List of lakes in Wisconsin

People
Mackie (surname)
Clan Mackie, a Scottish clan
Mackie Osborne, an artist responsible for the design and illustrations of many music albums since the 1980s
Malcolm Mackie Hobson (born 1966), South African former cricketer
J. L. Mackie, Australian-born philosopher, best known for his views on meta-ethics

Other uses
Mackie's, Scottish ice cream and confectionery manufacturer
Mackie Designs, parent company of Mackie and other musical instrument and professional audio equipment brands, now known as LOUD Audio
Mackie International, a textile machinery engineering plant and foundry in Northern Ireland
Mackie Academy, a secondary school in Stonehaven, Aberdeenshire, Scotland
Mackie Building, Milwaukee, Wisconsin, United States, on the National Register of Historic Places

See also
Mackie lines, a border effect in photography